Diaporthe arctii is a fungal plant pathogen.

Subspecies
 Diaporthe arctii var. achilleae

References

Fungal plant pathogens and diseases
arctii
Fungi described in 1833